Gamma Flight is the name of three fictional Canadian teams of superheroes appearing in American comic books published by Marvel Comics.

Publication history
The first version of Gamma Flight debuted in Alpha Flight #1 and was created by John Byrne.

Fictional team biography

Flight tier level
Gamma Flight first appeared in Alpha Flight #1 (August 1983).

The original Gamma Flight served as the first tier in the three-tier process of becoming a member of Alpha Flight as instituted by Department H. Gamma Flight was mostly raw recruits. After a training period, theoretically they would be upgraded to Beta Flight and eventually to Alpha Flight, the premiere official superhero team of Canada. The members were Diamond Lil, Smart Alec, Wild Child, and Madison Jeffries.

Many former Gamma Flight members were convinced by Jerry Jaxon and Delphine Courtney to join Omega Flight in his bid to destroy James Hudson.

Canadian government sanctioned team
The Canadian government founded a new sanctioned superhero team after the disappearance of Alpha Flight. This Gamma Flight included Nemesis, Wildchild, Silver, Auric and Witchfire. With Alpha Flight implicated in various misdeeds that occurred, Gamma Flight had orders to bring them to the authorities. This team was later disbanded in a merger with Department H and Alpha Flight with some members leaving.

Support operation
In a revived Department H, Gamma Flight refers to support operations.

Alpha Flight Space Program version
After Hulk escaped from General Reginald Fortean's custody, a depowered Walter Langkowski formed a new version of Gamma Flight to go after Hulk by starting with Puck as its first member.

Walter and Gamma Flight arrived at the area where the gamma bomb first turned Bruce Banner into Hulk. As Hulk fought Gamma Flight, Absorbing Man absorbed the leftover gamma radiation that enabled the One-Below-All to plunge New Mexico into its Below-Place. After Hulk defeated the One-Below-All, Walter and Gamma Flight were returned to Earth where Absorbing Man joined the group.

With Titania as its latest member, Walter and Gamma Flight ran into Doc Samson who reveals to them Hulk's plans to wipe out the human civilization.

Arriving in Reno, Nevada, Walter and Gamma Flight found the Subject B husk that the U.S. Hulk Operations placed Rick Jones' body in. They take it to the Alpha Flight Low-Orbit Space Station for study. Wearing the Hulkbuster-Redeemer armor, General Fortean raided the Alpha Flight Low-Orbit Space Station to reclaim the Subject B husk. While taking out the Gamma Flight members, Fortean also shoots Walter to make him pay for the deaths his Sasquatch form caused before making off with the Subject B husk. Gamma Flight teleported themselves to the U.S. Hulk Operation's base at Gloom Lake in Area 51 to attack it. While the U.S. Hulk Operations anticipated their arrival, Doc Samson was shocked when General Fortean had merged with the Subject B husk. The confrontation was interrupted when Hulk, Rick Jones, Betty Ross/The Harpy, and Jackie McGee raided the base.

Collected editions

References

External links
 Gamma Flight at Marvel.com
 Gamma Flight at Marvel Wiki
 Gamma Flight (Alpha Flight Space Program version) at Marvel Wiki
 Gamma Flight at Comic Vine
 The Appendix to the Handbook to the Marvel Universe: Gamma Flight entry
 AlphaFlight.Net Alphanex Entry on Gamma Flight I
 AlphaFlight.Net Alphanex Entry on Gamma Flight II

Alpha Flight
X-Men supporting characters